What Scoundrels Men Are! (Italian: Gli uomini, che mascalzoni!) is a 1953 Italian comedy film directed by Glauco Pellegrini and starring Walter Chiari,  Antonella Lualdi and Myriam Bru. It is a remake of the 1932 film of the same title starring Vittorio De Sica.

Plot 
Elsa is a rich and mature widow and has two children, Franca and Giorgetto. Bruno is at her service as a driver. Both the mother and the daughter enter into sympathy with the young driver, whom he thinks of both as possible wives, but he cannot make up his own mind. Then there is Gina, the owner of a garage, who is about to separate from her husband. Together with Giorgetto, Bruno then finds himself following another girl, a shop assistant at the Rinascente. Mariuccia, this is her name, is a poor and serious girl: Bruno tries a little for fun, a little to challenge Giorgetto, who had not managed to conquer her, but ends up falling in love with her and marrying her. He will become a street driver, like her father.

Cast
 Walter Chiari as Bruno  
 Antonella Lualdi as Mariuccia  
 Myriam Bru as Franca  
 Julien Carette as Padre di mariuccia  
 Marie Glory as Elsa  
 Jone Salinas as Gina  
 Silvio Bagolini as Lello  
 Paola Borboni as madre di Bruno  
 Renato Salvatori as Carletto  
 Lola Braccini as owner of boarding house

References

Bibliography 
 Bayman, Louis (ed.) Directory of World Cinema: Italy. Intellect Books, 2011.

External links 
 

1953 comedy films
Italian comedy films
1953 films
1950s Italian-language films
Films directed by Glauco Pellegrini
Remakes of Italian films
Italian black-and-white films
1950s Italian films